Yelvanny Salmyn Rose(born 8 August 1980 in Seychelles) is a Seychellois footballer who plays for Anse Réunion FC of the Seychelles First Division.

Career

Seychelles

More than a year after his spell in Vietnam, the then 26-year old shot the 2006 championship-winning goal for Anse Reunion, clinching the club's first league title in the process.

With La Passe FC in 2011, the forward hit a hat-trick against Northern Dynamo FC, taking his club to second place.

South Africa

Yelvanny tried out for Silver Stars in 2004 with the help of former Anse Reunion coach Walter da Silva.

Vietnam
Trying out with V.League 1 side Dong Tam Long An in winter 2004, Rose penned a deal with the club and was loaned to Vietnamese First Division team Quang Nam F.C. in early 2005. Four months later, the striker left Vietnam, often having contretemps with his teammates and aggrieved by the way the management did not honor the terms on his contract. In total, Rose started four times and was substituted on most occasions during his stint in there.

References

External links

1980 births
Living people
Seychellois footballers
Seychelles international footballers
Anse Réunion FC players
La Passe FC players
Quang Nam FC players
Seychellois expatriate footballers
Expatriate footballers in Vietnam
Association football forwards